"The Power of Love" is a song originally recorded and released by British band Frankie Goes to Hollywood. It was written by Holly Johnson, Peter Gill, Mark O'Toole and Brian Nash, four of the five members of the band. It was released by the group as their third single.

Initially issued as a single in November 1984, and taken from the album Welcome to the Pleasuredome, "The Power of Love" followed its two predecessors, "Relax" and "Two Tribes", to the top of the UK singles chart. It scored the band an early December number-one. "The Power of Love" was also a top 10 hit in several European countries, in Australia and New Zealand, and in Canada. "The Power of Love" is often regarded as a Christmas song, despite having no reference to Christmas within the song lyrics. However, the accompanying video features the Nativity of Jesus, and the single cover was The Assumption of the Virgin. The single spent just one week at Number One in the UK, outsold by the charity single "Do They Know It's Christmas?" by Band Aid, which until 1997 was the best selling single ever in the UK.

Since then, reissues and/or remixes of the Frankie Goes to Hollywood recording of this song have been top 10 UK hits on two other occasions, hitting number 10 in 1993 and number 6 in 2000. "The Power of Love" has also charted in the UK in a version by Holly Johnson (a solo recording from 1999). The original version by Frankie Goes to Hollywood was featured in the 2012 film Sightseers, the same year that the song was reissued as a digital download and peaked at number 42, in response to a cover version by Gabrielle Aplin. Her recording of the song also went to number 1 in the UK, exactly 28 years after the original Frankie Goes to Hollywood single topped the chart.

Holly Johnson, who co-wrote the song, later reminisced: "I always felt like 'The Power of Love' was the record that would save me in this life. There is a biblical aspect to its spirituality and passion; the fact that love is the only thing that matters in the end."

Frankie Goes to Hollywood version
The track was first featured during the John Peel Sessions the band performed on during 1983, which was slower and emphasised the track's original camp ironic content (such as the Hooded Claw from the cartoon series The Perils of Penelope Pitstop). After recording at the original speed, ZTT/Trevor Horn sped it up, this also caused a change in pitch.

"The Power of Love" became Frankie Goes to Hollywood's third consecutive (and last) number 1 UK single in December 1984. To commemorate the Christmas release, Godley & Creme directed a Nativity-themed video for the single, and the artwork for the single also used traditional Christian iconography. The original showing of the video on The Tube featured the Nativity occupying the whole screen, however the borders of band members were added for later showings due to pressure from UK broadcasters.

The 12" mix of the song featured actor Chris Barrie aping DJ Mike Read's banning of the single "Relax", as well as his impression of Ronald Reagan, instructing the listener in prayer. The single also featured a Christmas message from the band, entitled "Holier Than Thou".

On the cover is a reproduction of the Assumption of the Virgin by Titian, a 16th-century painting in the Basilica di Santa Maria Gloriosa dei Frari of Venice.

The single has been reissued in various formats over the years. The 1993 reissue charted at number 10 in the UK; the 2000 remix version reached number 6.

Track listing
All discographical information here pertains to UK releases only (unless otherwise noted).

7": ZTT / ZTAS 5 (United Kingdom) 
 "The Power of Love" (7" mix) - 5:27
 "The World Is My Oyster" (7" mix) - 4:13
Also available as a picture disc carrying the same tracks. (PZTAS5)

12": ZTT / 12 ZTAS 5 (United Kingdom) 
 "The Power of Love" (Extended version) - 9:28
 "The World Is My Oyster" (Scrapped) - 1:38
 "Holier Than Thou" (The first) - 1:08
 "The World Is My Oyster" (Trapped) [Instrumental] - 2:29
 "Holier Than Thou" (The second) - 4:10
 "The Power of Love" (Instrumental) [Unlisted] - 2:27

 The cassette, 7" single and the standard 12" single were all released in a "hearts and crosses" cardboard envelope.
 "Holier Than Thou" is a recording of band members attempting to record a Christmas message for fans and generally messing about in the recording studio. The final song on the disc is the continuation of the instrumental version of "The Power of Love" that begins side A, here finally reaching its conclusion. This section of music actually begins during the final part of the "Holier Than Thou" section, when Peter Gill is jokingly listing what he wants for Christmas.
 Also released as a picture disc carrying the same tracks (12PZTAS5).

12": ZTT / 12 XZTAS 5 (United Kingdom) 

"The Power of Love" (7" mix) - 5:27
"The World Is My Oyster" (12" mix) - 4:23
"Welcome to the Pleasuredome" (Pleasure fix) - 9:46
"The Only Star in Heaven" (Star fix) - 3:52

Released in a white gatefold sleeve with five photos.

MC: ZTT / CTIS 105 (United Kingdom) 
"The Power of Love" (Extended, singlette version) - 9:18
"The World Is My Oyster (Scrapped)" - 1:38
"Holier Than Thou (the first)" - 1:08
"The World Is My Oyster (Trapped)" - 2:29
"Holier Than Thou (the second)" - 4:10
"The Power of Love" (Instrumental, singlette version) [Unlisted] - 3:30

This complete cassette was re-released in 2012 on CD Sexmix Disk 1 Tracks 7-12. The end of "Instrumental" is identical to the opening of the regular extended version, but with "Relax" in the background.

Chart performance

Weekly charts

Year-end charts

Certifications

Reissues

1993 reissues
The 1993 re-issues featured the church in Ramsau bei Berchtesgaden on the cover.
CD ZTT / FGTH3CD (United Kingdom)
 "The Power of Love" - 5:29
 "The Power of Love" (Original extended mix) - 9:29
 "Rage Hard" (Original DJ mix) [Vocal edit] - 4:13
 "Holier Than Thou" (No Rest for the Best - Edit) - 3:29

CD ZTT / FGTH3CDX (United Kingdom)
 "The Power of Love" - 5:29
 "The Power of Love" (Original extended mix) - 9:29
 "Rage Hard" (Original DJ mix) [Vocal edit] - 4:13
 "The Power of Love" (Alternative mix) - 5:07

CD ZTT-Warner / 4509-94954-2 (Germany)
 "The Power of Love" (1994 radio love mix) - 3:47
 "The Power of Love" - 5:29

2000 reissues
CD ZTT / ZTT 150 CD (United Kingdom)
 "The Power of Love" (Rob Searle club mix edit) - 4:13
 "The Power of Love" (Rob Searle club mix) - 8:41
 "The Power of Love" (Minkys Yaba mix edit) - 5:05

12" ZTT / ZTT 150 T (United Kingdom)
 "The Power of Love" (Rob Searle club mix) - 8:38
 "The Power of Love" (Minky's Yaba mix) - 8:10

2012 reissue
MP3 download (United Kingdom)

 "The Power of Love" (Original 7" mix) - 5:30
 "The Power of Love" (Original 7" instrumental) - 5:30
 "The Power of Love" (Original 12" mix) - 9:30
 "The World Is My Oyster" - 4:17
 "The Power of Love" (Alternative mix) - 5:08
 "The Power of Love" (Best listened to by lovers) - 4:30
 "The Power of Love" (Instrumental, singlette version) - 3.34

 Best Listened to by Lovers is an orchestral instrumental from Anne Dudley's arrangement recorded as part of the original Welcome to the Pleasuredome album sessions in 1984 which was used for the first part of the original "Power of Love" 12" single, with added guitars. It was first released on the compilation CD Frankie Said earlier in 2012.
 Original 7" Instrumental is an instrumental version of the regular single / album track, and is unique to this release.

Other songs with the title in 1985
This was the first of three singles in the British top 10 with the title "The Power of Love" in 1985. The other two were "The Power of Love" by Huey Lewis and the News, which peaked at No. 9 at the start of autumn, and "The Power of Love" by Jennifer Rush, which reached No. 1 by the middle of autumn.

Holly Johnson version

Holly Johnson, former singer of Frankie Goes to Hollywood, recorded his own version of "The Power of Love" for his 1999 album Soulstream. It was released as the third single from the album, reaching number 56 in the UK. The single stayed in the charts for two weeks. A music video was created to promote the single.

The single was released by two separate CD versions, each featuring different tracks, with the second CD featuring "All U Need Is Love (Demo Version)", a demo version of the Soulstream album track.

Track listing
CD Single (CD1)
"The Power of Love" (Radio mix) - 5:08
"In the House of the Rising Sun" (12" definitive mix) - 5:36
"In the House of the Rising Sun" (Doogs House mix) - 5:04

CD Single (CD2)
"The Power of Love" (Millennium mix) - 5:36
"In the House of the Rising Sun (DNA instrumental mix)" - 5:32
"All U Need Is Love" (Demo version) - 4:59

CD Single (Promo)
"The Power of Love (Radio mix)" - 5:08
"The Power of Love (Millennium mix)" - 5:33
"In the House of the Rising Sun" (12" definitive mix) - 5:36
"In the House of the Rising Sun" (Doogs House mix) - 5:04
"In the House of the Rising Sun" (DNA instrumental mix) - 5:30

Remixes and B-sides
"The Power of Love" (Radio mix)
"In the House of the Rising Sun" (12" definitive mix)
"In the House of the Rising Sun" (Doogs House mix)
"The Power of Love" (Millennium mix)
"In the House of the Rising Sun" (DNA instrumental mix)
"All U Need Is Love" (Demo version)

Critical reception
Jon O'Brien of Allmusic reviewed the Soulstream album, and spoke of the song, stating "The William Orbit-esque production of the empowering opener "Lady Luck," and the subtle trip-hop-tinged title track show that Johnson still occasionally had his finger on the pulse. But unnecessary reworkings of 1984 chart-topper "The Power of Love" and the 1994 flop, gay anthem "Legendary Children (All of Them Queer)," only highlight the creative rut he appeared to be stuck in."

Chart performance

Gabrielle Aplin version

In 2012, British singer-songwriter Gabrielle Aplin released a cover version of the song produced by Mike Spencer and David Kosten. It was released on 9 November 2012 as a digital download as the lead single from her debut studio album English Rain (2013). The song was selected as the soundtrack to the John Lewis 2012 Christmas advertisement. The song was also used during an episode of Hollyoaks on 16 November 2012 after the sudden death of one of the show's main characters, and Mary and Francis’s wedding in the TV show, Reign. The song subsequently became popular in Australia in early 2014.

Music video
A music video to accompany the release of "The Power of Love" was first released onto YouTube on 9 November 2012. It shows Aplin in a room in a large house, playing a piano. Then, near the end of the video, fairy lights in the room light up. The video was directed by Alexander Brown.

Track listing

Chart performance
On 11 November 2012 "The Power of Love" entered the UK Singles Chart at number 36, a week later it climbed to number 5. On 9 December 2012 the single reached number 1. Aplin's version was certified gold in the United Kingdom on 11 January 2013.

On 8 December 2013, the song re-charted at number 88 on the UK Singles Chart, due to downloads.

Charts

Certifications

Year-end charts

Release history

Dalton Harris version

In 2018, the Jamaican-British singer Dalton Harris, a contestant and eventual winner of the 15th series of the UK TV talent competition programme The X Factor, released the song as his winning song from the series. The song was in association with and featuring additional vocals by the same series' 9th season winner James Arthur, making it the second time the winning song UK X Factor is promoted as a duet or group performance rather than a solo performance by the winner, after the winners of 2017 when Rak-Su duetted with Wyclef Jean and Naughty Boy for their single entitled "Dimelo".

As in many earlier X Factor-winning releases, VAT collected on sales of the X Factor winner's charity song will be donated to children's charities, Together for Short Lives and Shooting Star Chase, declared the UK Chancellor of the Exchequer, Philip Hammond. The UK Department of Health and Social Care will make the donation of the VAT on the UK government's behalf. This is reportedly The X Factor UK's 11th charity release.

Charts

Other cover versions
The song has been recorded by many other acts. Several Dutch heavy metal artists, including the lead singers of Nightwish, Epica and Within Temptation recorded a cover in support of the Red Cross aiding victims of sexual violence in war-zones.

References

1984 singles
1999 singles
2008 singles
2012 singles
2018 singles
Frankie Goes to Hollywood songs
Il Divo songs
Number-one singles in Iceland
UK Singles Chart number-one singles
Music videos directed by Godley and Creme
Songs written by Holly Johnson
Holly Johnson songs
Gabrielle Aplin songs
Dalton Harris songs
James Arthur songs
Songs written by Peter Gill (FGTH drummer)
Songs written by Mark O'Toole (musician)
1984 songs
Pop ballads
ZTT Records singles
Parlophone singles
Song recordings produced by Trevor Horn
The X Factor (British TV series)
Syco Music singles
1980s ballads